Guaracy Batista da Silveira (born 2 January 1951) is a Brazilian politician and pastor. Although born in São Paulo, he has spent his political career representing Tocantins, having served as national senator from 2018 to 2019.

Personal life
Silveria was born in Capão Bonito. He is a bishop in the International Church of the Foursquare Gospel.

Political career
In the 2014 Brazilian general election Silveria was elected as an alternate to Kátia Abreu for the state of Tocantins. During the 2018 Brazilian general election Abreu ran for vice-president for Ciro Gomes' campaign, leaving her post which Silvira served as her replacement in the Brazilian senate. While in the senate Silveria was criticized by media in Brazil for accumulating over R$ 1 million in dept, mostly in overspending of his salary on hotels.

References

1951 births
Living people
People from São Paulo (state)
Brazilian Pentecostal pastors
Members of the Foursquare Church
Avante (political party) politicians
Members of the Federal Senate (Brazil)